National school may refer to:
 National school (Ireland), a state-funded primary school in the Republic of Ireland
 National school (England and Wales), a Church of England school founded by the National Society in England and Wales in the 19th century
 National school (Sri Lanka), a school funded and administered by the central government (rather than a province)
 in Education in Malaysia, a government-run Malay-medium primary school

See also
 Colegio Nacional (disambiguation) ("National School" in Spanish)